Old Woman's River is a community in Bruce County, Ontario, Canada. It is located on the Bruce Peninsula in Southwestern Ontario.

Communities in Bruce County